Legislative elections were held in the Comoros on 25 January 2015, alongside local elections. A second round of voting was held on 22 February in the 21 constituencies where no candidate won in the first round. The Union for the Development of the Comoros emerged as the largest party, winning eight of the 24 seats in the Assembly of the Union.

Background
The term of the Assembly of the Union elected in 2009 was due to expire in April 2014, but was extended. Elections were initially scheduled for early November 2014, but in September President Ikililou Dhoinine announced that they would be delayed until 28 December, with the second round planned for 1 February. They were later delayed again until January 2015.

Electoral system
The 33 members of the Assembly of the Union were elected by two methods; 24 members were directly elected in single member constituencies using the two-round system, whilst nine members were elected by the Island assemblies.

Campaign
The campaigning period officially began on 25 December. A total of 204 candidates registered to run for election to the Assembly, whilst 353 candidates contested the council elections.

Results

Elected MPs

References

Comoros
2015 in the Comoros
Elections in the Comoros